Fables of the Sleepless Empire is the third and final full-length album by Canadian avant-garde extreme metal band uneXpect. It was released Independently on May 31, 2011

Track listing 
"Unsolved Ideas of a Distorted Guest" – 6:54
"Words" – 5:57
"Orange Vigilantes" – 4:55
"Mechanical Phoenix" – 6:55
"The Quantum Symphony" – 6:04
"Unfed Pendulum" – 7:55
"In the Mind of the Last Whale" – 2:58
"Silence this Parasite" – 5:19
"A Fading Stance" – 2:06
"When the Joyful Dead are Dancing" – 4:38 
"Until Yet a Few More Deaths Do Us Part" – 2:05

Personnel
Leïlindel – vocals
SyriaK – vocals, guitar
Artagoth – vocals, guitar
ExoD – keyboard, piano, sampling
Borboen – violin
ChaotH – 9-stringed bass guitar
Landryx – drums

Production
Mixed by Jef Fortin with the assistance of Syriak, Leïlindel & Unexpect at Badass Studio.
Mastered, Engineered, Edited and Re-amped by Jef Fortin at Badass Studio.
Drums, Vocals & Bass Recorded at Badass Studio by Jef Fortin.
Guitars, Keyboard & Violins recorded at home studios.
Additional Vocal track recorded at J-C Desjardins (Caraan & Shy Shit) home studio.
All inside graphic work and modifications have been done by Éric Charron; cover art by Mario Sanchez Nevado.
Photographies by Élaine Phaneuf .

Unexpect albums
2011 albums